Overseas France consists of 13 French-administered territories outside Europe, mostly the remains of the French colonial empire that remained a part of the French state under various statuses after decolonization. Some, but not all, are part of the European Union. "Overseas France" is a collective name; while used in everyday life in France, it is not an administrative designation in its own right. Instead, the five overseas regions have exactly the same administrative status  as the metropolitan regions; the five overseas collectivities are semi-autonomous; and New Caledonia is an autonomous territory. Overseas France includes island territories in the Atlantic, Pacific and Indian Oceans, French Guiana on the South American continent, and several peri-Antarctic islands as well as a claim in Antarctica. Its exclusive economic zone (EEZ) of  accounts for 96.7% of the EEZ of the French Republic.

Outside Europe, four broad classes of overseas French territorial administration currently exist: overseas departments/regions, overseas collectivities, the sui generis territory of New Caledonia, and uninhabited territories. From a legal and administrative standpoint, these four classes have varying legal status and levels of autonomy, although all permanently inhabited territories have representation in both France's National Assembly and Senate, which together make up the French Parliament. 

2,816,000 people lived in overseas France in January 2023. Most of these residents are citizens of France and citizens of the European Union. This makes them able to vote in French and European elections.

Varying constitutional statuses

Overseas regions and departments 

Overseas regions have exactly the same status as France's mainland regions. The French Constitution provides that, in general, French laws and regulations (France's civil code, penal code, administrative law, social laws, tax laws, etc.) apply to French overseas regions just as in metropolitan France, but can be adapted as needed to suit the region's particular needs. Hence, the local administrations of French overseas regions cannot themselves pass new laws.

French Guiana (since 1946)
Guadeloupe (since 1946)
Martinique (since 1946)
Mayotte (since 2011) 1976–2003: sui generis overseas territory; 2001–2003: with the designation departmental community; 2003–2011: overseas community. In the 2009 Mahoran status referendum, Mahorans voted to become an overseas department in 2011, which occurred on 31 March 2011. 
Réunion (since 1946)

Overseas collectivities 

The category of "overseas collectivity" (French: collectivité d'outre-mer or COM) was created by France's constitutional reform of 28 March 2003. Each overseas collectivity has its own statutory laws.

In contrast to overseas departments/regions, the overseas collectivities are empowered to make their own laws, except in certain areas reserved to the French national government (such as defense, international relations, trade and currency, and judicial and administrative law). The overseas collectivities are governed by local elected assemblies and by the French Parliament and French Government, with a cabinet member, the Minister of the Overseas, in charge of issues related to the overseas territories. 

 French Polynesia (1946–2003: overseas territory, since 2003: overseas collectivity) In 2004 it was given the designation of "overseas country", but the Constitutional Council of France has clarified that this designation did not create a new political category.
 Saint Barthélemy: In 2003, Saint-Barthélemy voted to become an overseas collectivity of France. Saint-Barthélemy is not part of the European Union, having changed the status to an overseas country or territory associated with the European Union in 2012.
 Saint Martin: In 2003, the populations of Saint-Martin voted in favour of secession from Guadeloupe in order to become separate overseas collectivity of France. On 7 February 2007, the French Parliament passed a bill granting COM status to both jurisdictions. The new status took effect on 22 February 2007 when the law was published in the Journal Officiel. Saint-Martin remains part of the European Union, as stated in the Treaty of Lisbon.
 Saint Pierre and Miquelon (1976–85: overseas department, 1985–2003: sui generis overseas territory, since 2003: overseas collectivity). Despite being given the political status of "overseas collectivity," Saint Pierre et Miquelon is called , literally "territorial collectivity."
 Wallis and Futuna (1961–2003: overseas territory, since 2003: overseas collectivity).

Sui generis collectivity 
 New Caledonia had the status of an overseas territory from 1946 to 1998, but as of the 1998 Nouméa Accord it gained a special status ( or sui generis) in 1999. A New Caledonian citizenship was established (in addition to the French citizenship which is kept in parallel, along with the European citizenship), and a gradual transfer of power from the French state to New Caledonia itself was begun, to last from 15 to 20 years.

However, this process was subject to approval in a referendum.  Three independence referendums have been held, in 2018, 2020 and 2021.  In the third referendum, in December 2021, 96.5% rejected independence but the turnout was only 43.9%.  In the two earlier referendums the "no" vote was 57% and 53% respectively.

The future status within France of New Caledonia will now be the subject of a further referendum to be held before the end of 2023.

Overseas territory 

 French Southern and Antarctic Lands ( or TAAF); overseas territory of France (since 1956). It is currently the only overseas territory.

Special status 
It is held as an overseas state private property under the direct authority of the French government, and is administered by France's Overseas Minister.

Political representation in legislatures 

With 2,816,000 inhabitants in 2023, overseas France accounts for 4.1% of the population of the French Republic. They enjoy a corresponding representation in the two chambers of the French Parliament and in the 16th legislature of the French Fifth Republic (2022-2027) overseas France is represented by 27 deputies in the French National Assembly, accounting for 4.7% of the 577 deputies in the National Assembly:

Réunion: 7  
Guadeloupe: 4  
Martinique: 4  
French Polynesia: 3  
French Guiana: 2 
Mayotte: 2 
New Caledonia: 2  
Saint Barthélemy and Saint Martin: 1  
Saint Pierre and Miquelon: 1 
Wallis and Futuna: 1

Senate (France)
Since September 2011, overseas France has been represented by 21 senators in the French Senate, accounting for 6.0% of the 348 senators in the Senate:

Réunion: 4 
Guadeloupe: 3  
French Guiana: 2  
French Polynesia: 2  
Martinique: 2  
Mayotte: 2  
New Caledonia: 2  
Saint Barthélemy: 1  
Saint Martin: 1  
Saint Pierre and Miquelon: 1  
Wallis and Futuna: 1

European Parliament (European Union) 
The territories used to be collectively represented in the European Parliament by the Overseas Territories of France constituency. Since the 2019 European elections, France decided to switch to a single constituency, putting an end to all regional constituencies, including the Overseas Territories constituency.

Council (European Union) 
The special territories of EU Member states are not separately represented in the EU Council. Every member state represents all its citizens in the Council.

Overview

Inhabited departments and collectivities 
The eleven inhabited French overseas territories are:

Uninhabited overseas territories 
Several of these territories are generally only transiently inhabited by researchers in scientific stations.

Map

Largest cities in overseas France 
Ranked by population in the metropolitan area:

Fort-de-France (Martinique): 347,170 inhabitants (in 2020)
Saint Denis (Réunion): 315,080 (in 2020)
Pointe-à-Pitre–Les Abymes (Guadeloupe): 312,630 (in 2020)
Saint Pierre–Le Tampon (Réunion): 222,614 (in 2020)
Nouméa (New Caledonia): 182,341 (in 2019)
Saint Paul (Réunion): 171,109 (in 2020)
Cayenne (French Guiana): 151,887 (in 2020)
Papeete (French Polynesia): 138,861 (in 2022)

See also

2009 Mahoran status referendum
Administrative divisions of France
Communes of France
French colonial empire
Government of France
List of French possessions and colonies
List of islands administered by France in the Indian and Pacific oceans
Metropolitan France
Organisation internationale de la Francophonie
Outre-mer
Overseas collectivity
Overseas department and region
Overseas military bases of France
Overseas Territories of France (European Parliament constituency)
Overseas territory
Special member state territories and the European Union
Volontaire Civil à l'Aide Technique
French claims in Jerusalem:
Church of the Pater Noster
Benedictine monastery in Abu Ghosh
Tombs of the Kings
Church of Saint Anne

Notes

References

Further reading 
 Robert Aldrich and John Connell, France's Overseas Frontier, Cambridge University Press, 1992.
 Frédéric Monera, L'idée de République et la jurisprudence du Conseil constitutionnel, Paris: L.G.D.J., 2004.

External links 
 
 

 
Subdivisions of France
France